
Walter Howchin (12 January 1845 – 27 November 1937) was a geologist who lectured in mineralogy and palaeontology at the former Adelaide School of Mines and the University of Adelaide; he won the Clarke Medal in 1907.

Early life
Howchin was born in Norwich, England, the child of Mary Ann Ward, née Goose and the Primitive Methodist minister Rev. Richard Howchin, who had attended Elmfield College 
 and was subsequently (1870) acquitted of murder in Liverpool.

He was one of eleven children. and attended the Academy, King's Lynn, which he left aged 12 to study for the Methodist ministry. He was ordained towards the end of 1864. His first circuit was Shotley Bridge, Durham, and during the next 16 years he moved between a number of parishes in the Tyne valley. He began to take an interest in geology at an early age, and found much to develop this interest in the abundant local outcrops of coal-bearing and associated rocks of Carboniferous age. Howchin discovered abundant glacial till at Haltwhistle, the study of which led to work that later made him famous. His interest in the flint implements of Northumberland led to the later study of stone implements of the Australian aborigines. In 1876, in conjunction with H. B. Brady, Howchin did some important work on the foraminifera of Carboniferous and Permian age, and became a fellow of the Geological Society of London in 1878.

Australia
After contracting tuberculosis, Howchin emigrated to Australia in 1881. The change of climate helped his condition and he recovered fully. For some time he served as a supernumerary minister in South Australia, did some journalistic work, and was secretary to the Adelaide Children's Hospital from 1886 to 1901. He was a prominent member of the Royal Society and its offshoot the Field Naturalists Society. Howchin held lecturing positions in mineralogy at the Adelaide School of Mines from 1899 to 1904, and geology and palaeontology at the University of Adelaide from 1902 to 1918, achieving the status of Honorary Professor in the latter year. Howchin retired in 1920, retaining his title of Honorary Professor and continuing his work as a geologist for many years.

In 1909 Howchin published The Geography of South Australia, a popular book for use in schools, which was followed in 1918 by The Geology of South Australia, a volume of well over 500 pages. These books remained in use as student textbooks for some decades. The Building of Australia and the Succession of Life, with Special Reference to South Australia, was published in three parts (1925–30), and in 1934 he published The Stone Implements of the Adelaide Tribe of Aborigines.

Although Howchin published scientific papers throughout his career, his activity increased with age. In the last 30 years of his life his productivity was extraordinary for a man of his years; in 1933 the Transactions and Proceedings of the Royal Society of South Australia listed more than 100 of his papers. His most important work was on a series of glacial rocks, that he referred to as the 'Cambrian series' of the Mount Lofty Ranges, but are now known to be Permian, which gave rise to much controversy. For much of this later period of his life he was closely associated with another great Australian geologist of his era, Edgeworth David.

Legacy
Howchin died in Adelaide on 27 November 1937 aged 92; he married Esther Gibbons (died 1924) in 1869, and was survived by two daughters. He was awarded the Clarke Medal of the Royal Society of New South Wales in 1907, the Ferdinand von Mueller Medal by the Australasian Association for the Advancement of Science in 1913, a grant from the Lyell Geological Fund, Geological Society of London in 1914, the Sir Joseph Verco Medal of the Royal Society of South Australia in 1929, and the Lyell Medal of the Geological Society of London in 1934.

A man of short and stocky build, Howchin came to Australia at 36 years of age thinking his life may soon be over. But he proved to lead a long and vigorous life; it is claimed that he was still collecting specimens and visiting sites into his nineties.

The Walter Howchin Medal of the SA Division of the Geological Society of Australia is "awarded annually to a researcher in the early stage of their career that is distinguished by their significant published research work within the earth sciences in South Australia".

References

Australian geologists
Geologists from Norwich
1845 births
1937 deaths
Fellows of the Geological Society of London
Australian people of English descent
Lyell Medal winners